Svan may refer to:
Svan people, an ethnic group of the Georgian people
Svan language
Svaneti, a region of Georgia
Lusaghbyur, Shirak, Armenia, formerly called Svan
Anaco Airport, ICAO code
Gunde Svan, former Swedish top-level cross-country skier